David Curtis may refer to:
David Curtis (rugby union) (born 1965), Irish rugby union international
David L. Curtis (born 1947), American politician in the North Carolina Senate
David Roderick Curtis (1927–2017), Australian scientist
David Whitney Curtis (1833–?), American politician
Hillman Curtis (David Hillman Curtis, 1961–2012), American new media designer, author, musician and filmmaker
 Dave Curtis (born 1946), American sailor